Yetunde Onanuga (born 11 September 1960) is a Nigerian politician who was the deputy governor of Ogun state from 2015 to 2019.

Life
Yetunde Onanuga was born at Adeoyo Hospital in Ibadan, the capital of Oyo State in Nigeria. Her father was F.T. Fabamwo.

She was educated in Ogun state and then in Lagos where she obtained her teachers certificate. She later completed an MBA at Ogun State University.

She was working in the Lagos State ministry of environment when she was chosen as the running mate of the state governor Ibikunle Amosun in 2015. Amosun was the sitting candidate but his previous deputy governor had defected to an opposition party. Amosun chose Onanuga out of three possible candidates.

Onanuga was elected deputy governor.

References

1960 births
Living people
Politicians from Ibadan
21st-century Nigerian politicians
Yoruba women in politics
Olabisi Onabanjo University alumni
21st-century Nigerian women politicians
All Progressives Congress politicians